Elections to Adur District Council were held on 2 May 2002. One third of the council was up for election and the Conservative Party gained control of the council from no overall control. Overall turnout was 33%.

The Conservatives won 9 of the 14 seats up for election after the Liberal Democrats did not stand any candidates.

After the election, the composition of the council was:
Conservative 23
Labour 11
Independent 4
Liberal Democrat 1

Results

Ward results

References

BBC report of 2002 Adur election result

2002 English local elections
2002
2000s in West Sussex